Robert Alan Shearer  (25 May 1948 – 9 January 2022) was an Australian professional golfer and golf course architect.

Early life and amateur career
Shearer was born in Melbourne, Victoria. He won the 1969 Australian Amateur, having been a joint medalist the previous year.

Professional career
Shearer turned professional in early 1971. He won the PGA Tour of Australia Order of Merit four times: 1974, 1977, 1981, 1982. He spent five years on the European Tour and then nine on the PGA Tour. His career year was 1982 when he won the Australian Open and his sole PGA Tour event, the Tallahassee Open. He had 18 top-10 finishes in PGA Tour events. His best finish in a major championship was a T-7 at the 1978 Open Championship.

Later he split his time between his golf course design work and the European Senior Tour.

Death
Shearer died from a heart attack on 9 January 2022, at the age of 73.

Amateur wins
1969 Australian Amateur

Professional wins (27)

PGA Tour wins (1)

PGA Tour playoff record (0–1)

European Tour wins (2)

European Tour playoff record (0–1)

PGA Tour of Australasia wins (18)

PGA Tour of Australasia playoff record (4–0)

Other Australasian wins (2)
1983 ABE Holdings–Jack Newton Classic (incorporating the New South Wales PGA Championship)
1985 South West Open

European Senior Tour wins (4)

European Senior Tour playoff record (0–1)

Results in major championships

CUT = missed the half-way cut
WD = withdrew
"T" indicates a tie for a place

Team appearances
Amateur
Australian Men's Interstate Teams Matches (representing Victoria): 1970

Professional
World Cup (representing Australia): 1975, 1976

See also 
Spring 1976 PGA Tour Qualifying School graduates

References

External links

Australian male golfers
PGA Tour of Australasia golfers
PGA Tour golfers
European Tour golfers
European Senior Tour golfers
Golf course architects
Golfers from Melbourne
Recipients of the Medal of the Order of Australia
1948 births
2022 deaths